The Panamint chipmunk (Neotamias panamintinus) is a species of rodent in the squirrel family, Sciuridae. It is endemic to desert mountain areas of southeast California and southwest Nevada in the United States.

It is considered a species of least concern on the IUCN Red List due to its broad range, prevalence, and no known major threats. The Panamint chipmunk occurs in pinyon pine-juniper woodlands in bushes, boulders, and on cliffs.

Environmentally, the Panamint chipmunks are a prey species that contributes to the diets of their predators, including birds, raptors, coyotes, foxes, and bobcats.

References

External links

Neotamias
Fauna of the Mojave Desert
Mammals of the United States
Rodents of North America
Death Valley National Park
Panamint Range
Least concern biota of the United States
Mammals described in 1893
Taxonomy articles created by Polbot